Javier Sánchez Toril del Pino (born 16 June 1975) is a Spanish water polo player and bronze medalist at the 1997 Mediterranean Games. He was a member of the Spain men's national water polo team, playing as a centre forward. He was a part of the  team at the 2000 Summer Olympics and 2004 Summer Olympics. On club level he played for CN Atlètic-Barceloneta in Spain.

See also
 List of world champions in men's water polo
 List of World Aquatics Championships medalists in water polo

References

External links
 

1975 births
Living people
Spanish male water polo players
Water polo players at the 2000 Summer Olympics
Water polo players at the 2004 Summer Olympics
Olympic water polo players of Spain
Sportspeople from Madrid
Competitors at the 1997 Mediterranean Games
Mediterranean Games medalists in water polo
Mediterranean Games bronze medalists for Spain
Water polo players from the Community of Madrid